

Fermoy Estate is an Australian winery at Wilyabrup, in the Margaret River wine region of Western Australia.  Established by John and Beryl Anderson in 1985, it was named in honour of one of John Anderson's ancestors, a Scottish-born businessman who acquired part of Fermoy estate, just north of Cork, Ireland, and set up several industries there.

In 1999, the winery was purchased by Dutch/Swiss businessman Hans Hulsbergen.   Under his ownership, most of the winery's output was exported to Europe, where his wine business interests were centred. In December 2010, Hulsbergen sold the winery to Perth brothers Aaron and John Young.

Fermoy Estate has had a long association with Australian chef and restaurateur Luke Mangan.  In May 2004, its Cabernet Sauvignon 2001 was served at a state dinner hosted by Mangan at the Australian Embassy, Copenhagen, for Frederik, Crown Prince of Denmark, and his then fiancée, Mary Donaldson, in the lead-up to their royal wedding.

See also

 Australian wine
 List of wineries in Western Australia
 Western Australian wine

References

Notes

Bibliography

External links

Fermoy Estate – official site

Companies established in 1985
Wilyabrup, Western Australia
Wineries in Western Australia
1985 establishments in Australia